Peter Štyvar (born 13 August 1980 in Rožňava) is a Slovak football striker who currently plays for SP MFK Rožňava. He's had spells in England with Championship side Bristol City and in Greece with Skoda Xanthi.

Club career
He scored the winning goal in the 2008–09 UEFA Cup group stage game against Aston Villa for MŠK Žilina, which they won 2–1. He joined Bristol City on 1 January 2009, signing a two-and-a-half year contract.

Štyvar made his Bristol City debut on 3 January against Premier League club Portsmouth in the FA Cup in a game that finished 0–0.
On 9 September 2010 Bristol City cancelled Styvar's contract.

Career statistics

International career
Slovakia national manager Vladimír Weiss selected him for the friendly match against Greece on 20 August 2008, but Štyvar did not play in this match. His international debut came in second half the Slovakia vs. Ukraine friendly match on 10 February 2009.

References

External links
 
 Eurofotbal profile
 
 Profile at iDNES.cz

1980 births
Living people
People from Rožňava
Association football forwards
Slovak footballers
Slovakia international footballers
FC Lokomotíva Košice players
FK Železiarne Podbrezová players
AS Trenčín players
FK Teplice players
MŠK Žilina players
Bristol City F.C. players
Xanthi F.C. players
FC Spartak Trnava players
ŠK Senec players
TJ Baník Ružiná players
Slovak Super Liga players
English Football League players
Super League Greece players
Slovak expatriate footballers
Expatriate footballers in the Czech Republic
Slovak expatriate sportspeople in the Czech Republic
Expatriate footballers in Greece
Expatriate footballers in England
Slovak expatriate sportspeople in England